Princess Bejaratana Rajasuda (24 November 1925 – 27 July 2011) was the only child of the King Vajiravudh of Thailand. She was a first cousin of King Bhumibol Adulyadej and third cousin of King Norodom Sihanouk of Cambodia on her maternal side.

Her funeral was held on 9 April 2012, at Sanam Luang ceremonial ground in Bangkok.

Biography

Princess Bejaratana was born on 24 November 1925 in the Grand Palace, Bangkok, the only child of King Vajiravudh (Rama VI) and Princess Suvadhana. Having seen his daughter only one time, the king died the following day. Her uncle, who became King Prajadhipok (Rama VII), performed the naming ceremony for the princess on 30 December.

Princess Bejaratana and her mother moved to Suan Hongsa Villa in Dusit Palace, where she received her education from a private tutor. They moved in with Queen Sri Savarindira (the Queen Dowager) during World War II, and the princess attended Rajani School until she was 12. She and her mother then moved to England, where she continued her education and took medication for her poor health. She first stayed at Fairhill Villa in Surrey, before settling in Brighton.

In November 1957, Princess Bejaratana returned to Thailand. She bought land on Sukhumvit Road Soi 38, and built Ruenruedi Villa Palace. The princess undertook her duties of representing the royal family. Her special interests were in education, public health, Buddhism, the soldiers and police guarding Thailand's borders, and general public welfare.

 

Near the end of her life she reduced her royal duties due to age, but occasionally still did work relating to her royal father.

Princess Bejaratana died on 27 July 2011 at 16:37 at Siriraj Hospital, Bangkok, aged 85.

Military rank
 General, Admiral and Air Chief Marshal

Ancestry

References

External links

 Ethailand
 Ancestry.com – HRH Princess Bejraratana Rajasuda
 http://www.puendee.com/index.php?main_page=product_info&cPath=41&products_id=468 
 http://www.baanjomyut.com/library/ratchasuda/index.html
 Bejaratana-Suvadhana Foundation 
 Biography and appearance of Princess Bejaratana Rajasuda – Sakulthai Magazine
 Princess Bejaratana Rajasuda of Thailand – Sakulthai Magazine

1925 births
2011 deaths
20th-century Thai women
20th-century Chakri dynasty
21st-century Thai women
21st-century Chakri dynasty
Thai female Chao Fa
Knights Grand Cordon of the Order of Chula Chom Klao
Knights of the Ratana Varabhorn Order of Merit
Members of the Order of the Direkgunabhorn
Knights Grand Cross of the Order of the Direkgunabhorn
Thai people of Khmer descent
Thai military personnel
Royal Thai Army personnel
Thai generals
Royal Thai Navy personnel
Thai admirals
Royal Thai Air Force personnel
Royal Thai Air Force air marshals
Daughters of kings